Robert Fausset (born 8 August 1934) is a former Fine Gael politician from County Cavan in Ireland. He was nominated to Seanad Éireann in October 1981 and served until April 1982. He was a member of Cavan County Council for the Ballyjamesduff electoral area from 1999–2004. He stood for election to Dáil Éireann for the Cavan–Monaghan constituency, at the 1981 and February 1982 general elections, but was unsuccessful on both occasions.

References

1934 births
Living people
Fine Gael senators
Members of the 15th Seanad
Local councillors in County Cavan
Irish farmers
Nominated members of Seanad Éireann